Rifa`i is a Sufi order founded in the 12th century.

Rifa'i or Rifai or  Refai or Refaie may also refer to:

People

Refai
Abdullah Al-Refai (1937–2005), Kuwaiti academic 
Kassim Al-Refai (born 1967), Jordanian artist, specialising in the plastic arts
Khemais Refai (born 1960), Tunisian boxer
Nour El-Refai (born 1987), Swedish actress and comedian
Zed Al Refai (born 1966), Kuwaiti climber

Refaie
Mohamed Refaie (born 1990), Egyptian footballer

Rifai
 Abdelmunim al-Rifai (1917–1985), Palestinian-Jordanian diplomat
 Achmad Rifa'i (1786–1870), Indonesian thinker and writer
 Achmad Rifai (born 1984), Indonesian footballer
 Ahmed al-Rifa'i (1118–1182), Iraqi founder of the Rifa'i Sufi order
 Fadi Rifai, Lebanese actor
 Ghassan al-Rifai (born 1942), Syrian economist
 Khalil Al-Rifa'i (1927–2006), Iraqi actor
 Mohamad Afa Al Rifai  (born 1988), Syrian footballer
 Muhamad Aly Rifai (born 1973), Arab-American physician
 Mustafa El-Rifai (born 1934), Egyptian businessman and politician
 Nureddine Rifai (1899–1980), Jordanian politician 
 Oliver Rifai (born 1993), Dutch footballer
 Rashid al-Rifai (1929–2009), Iraqi academic and administrator
 Samir al-Rifai (1901–1965), Jordanian politician and six-time prime minister of Jordan
 Samir Rifai (born 1966), Jordanian politician and Prime Minister of Jordan
 Taleb Rifai (born 1949), Jordanian administrator and executive 
 Wael Al Rifai (born 1990), Syrian footballer
 Zaid al-Rifai (born 1936), Prime Minister of Jordan, 1973–1976, 1985–1989
 Ziad Rifai (1967–2009), Syrian actor

with middle name
Ahmed Refai Taha (1954–2016) or Refa'i Ahmed Taha Musa or Ahmed Refa'i Taha, alias Abu Yasser al-Masri, an Egyptian leader of a terrorist component of al-Gama'a al-Islamiyya

Places
 Al-Rifa'i District, in the Dhi Qar Governorate, Iraq
 Al-Rifa'i Mosque, in Cairo, Egypt